The Khagga (کھگہ) are tribe of Arab origin and are classified under Arabic Shaikh clans. They are mostly found in south-west Punjab, Pakistan.They mainly speak Punjabi.

Khaggas claim to be Qureshi, and are descended from Jalal ud Din, a disciple of the famous Sufi, Mohammed Iraq. Khagga is said to mean a particular kind of fish; and the name was given to Jalal ud Din by his spiritual teacher on the occasion of his rescuing a boat overtaken by a storm. According to traditions, during the period of Sikh rule, if anyone was distressed they could take refuge in the home of any Khagga. Mr. Purser thus described them: "The Khaggas came to the Montgomery district ( Now Sahiwal ) after the conquest of Multan by Ranjit Singh.
Khagga is said to mean a particular kind of fish; and the name was given to Shah Jalal-ud-Din by his spiritual teacher on the occasion of his rescuing a boat overtaken by a storm. There is also a traditions, that during the period of Sikh rule (late 18th and early 19th Century), if anyone was distressed they could take refuge in the home of any Khagga. One has to understand that this was a time of great number of tribal feuds, and it was almost necessary to have someone who could be brought in as an arbitrator.

Early history

Khagga's having Hashmi Qureshi background. According to their traditions, they are descended from Khawaja Shah Jalal Din Muhammad Awais Jaafri Quraishi Hashm also known as Khawaja Awais Khagga. He is a direct descendant of Jaffar Bin Tyyar. He was a disciple of Shaikh Muhammad Iraqi, a saint of Awaisi chain of Sufis. He is believed to have arrived in Multan during the times of Sadruddin (son of famous Sufi Baha-ud-Din Zakariya) from Arabia and died in the year 700AH/1300AD. Shah Rukne Alam is said to have led his funeral prayers. He was buried in the graveyard of Basti Daira which was then known as Basti Shah Jalal. It has also been reported (Gilani, Aulia-i-Multan, 237) that the foundation stone of this tomb was laid by Shah Rukne Alam. He was buried in the mausoleum of his grandfather Bahauddin Zakriya Multani, according to his own will, after sometime, however, his coffin was transferred to the present mausoleum.

20 & 21 century

Khagga's  Entered Politics in 20 century, Pir Mian Bhuddan Shah Khagga Was First MLA From Khanewal in 1946 He was very close to the Quaid E Azam Muhammad Ali Jinnah & Was Very Active Worker Of Pakistan Muslim League which lead to making of Pakistan. He Is Included In Notable Families in Biographical Encyclopidia of Pakistan. His Son Pir Mian Qamar Zaman Shah Khagga, studied from University Of Florida, Was Thrice Elected MNA, Twice Mpa, From Khanewal, He Was Also Federal Minister In Ayub Khan's Era, And Provincial Minister In Zia Ul Haq Era. Ayub Khan Also visited Their Home In 60's. It is said that after execution of Zulfiqar Ali Bhutto Benazir Bhutto resided in his home while afraid of Arrest. His Nephew Mian Masab Haider Shah Khagga was Also Elected Once MNA And Once MPA From Khanewal. His Son Pir Mian Muhammad Hayat Shah Khagga is Also Very Active In Politics and Well Known Among His People. Col(Retd) Abid Mehmood Shah Khagga is Also Very Active on National Level Politics and Is Very Close To the Prime Minister Imran Khan. He Is Founding Member of Pakistan Tehreek-e-Insaf In The South Punjab. He Also fought MNA in 2013. Pir Wallayat Shah Khagga was Also Elected MPA Thrice From Sahiwal. His Son Pir Khizar Hayat Shah Khagga is Present MPA. Pir Mushtaq Shah Khagga Was Elected MPA Once From Mian Channu. Brothers Pir Muhammad Shah Khagga & Pir Ahmad Shah Khagga Elected Twice MNA and Thrice MPA From Pakpattan, They Are Also Very Active In National Level Politics. Khagga's Are Featured In The 2017 Pakistani Movie Punjab Nahi Jaungi

Distribution

They are found throughout South Punjab. In South Punjab the Khaggas own land in Multan and Mailsi tahsils and are regarded with a certain amount of respect. Important Khagga villages include Mouza Alam Shah Khagga Tehsil Tandlianwala Dist. Faisalabad, Chak Shahana, Estate Of Vehniwal Jahanian and Bherowal in Khanewal District, Noor Shah village in Sahiwal District. and Pakka Majeed near the town of Mian Channu. Other Khaga villages include Moza Akbar Shah Anad Aurangabad in Sahiwal District and Chak Shah Khagga in Pakpatan District.moza ahmad shah khagga Sahiwal district khagga family is also in District Muzaffar Garh Tehsil Kot Addu Bastti Patal and Bastti Kut Saleem wala,Kot Addu City and Bastti Shah wala chowk Sarwer Shaheed Tehsil Kot Addu District Muzaffar Garh Punjab Pakistan, moza sha Quddos khagga Luddan Tehsil & District Vehari

Punjabi tribes